Sporting Clube de Portugal is a professional volleyball team based in Lisbon, Portugal. It's the volleyball section of Sporting CP.

History
Volleyball was introduced in Sporting Clube de Portugal in the thirties by influence of Salazar Carreira, constituting itself the club as one of the founders of the Association of Volleyball of Lisbon, 28 of December 1938.

The club would only reach its first titles in the fifties thanks to the dynamism of Professor Moniz Pereira, who was a manager, coach and player of the team that, in the 1953/54 season, broke the hegemony of the Instituto Superior Técnico that until then had conquered all National Championships, which were disputed since 1947. In addition to Moniz Pereira, the Yugoslavs Jost and Budisin, Xara Brazil, Marques Pereira, Fernando Fezas Vital, Machado da Costa, Anibal Rebelo and Plácido Martins.

At the women's level the first official competition began in June 1951, and Sporting Clube de Portugal was one of four clubs that took part in the competition, with the Lionesses being in second place. After a brilliant period with the achievement of the National Championships of 1953/54 and 1955/56, the modality declined, being fundamentally supported by successes at the training levels and at the feminine level, ending up being extinguished at the beginning of the 1964/65 season with the club's restructuring.

At the end of almost two decades of interregnum, the sport was again practiced in 1981/82, first only in the women's sector in the senior and junior years, so that the volleyball later returned in force to Sporting and to those that were the golden years of the modality in Alvalade, the 90s, with a team led by António Rodrigues, and with some of the best players of the time, such as Nilson Júnior, Carlos Natário, Miguel Maia, Wagner Silva, Luís Cláudio, Magrão, Filipe Vitó, Marcelo and Maurício Cavalcanti. Carlos Silveira, Miguel Soares and Américo Silva, Sporting was Tri-National Champion and won a Portuguese Cup and two Super Cups.

In the first half of the decade of 1990, to the referred conquests were added still more two Cups of Portugal and a Supertaca. However, the victorious momentum was abruptly interrupted at the beginning of the Roquete Project in 1995. One of the first measures of financial reorganization of the Board chaired by Santana Lopes was to end various high competition modalities, including Volleyball.

In November 1995, a group of coaches, athletes and their parents from the former section decided to found the Lisbon Volleyball Center, a non-profit sports institution dedicated to teaching and practicing the sport.

On 5 June 2017, Sporting Clube de Portugal officially announces that Volleyball will become part of Leon's eclecticism again, with the men's senior team competing in the First National Division in the 2017/18 season, with the undisputed Miguel Maia.

Facilities

Pavilhão João Rocha
Pavilhão João Rocha is a multi-sports pavilion located in the parish of Lumiar, in Lisbon. Located next to the Estádio José Alvalade, it is the home of Sporting CP sports. In honor of one of the most distinguished figures in the history of Sporting, the pavilion was named after former club president, João Rocha, who remained in office from September 1973 to October 1986. Its inauguration took place on the day June 21, 2017.

Honours

Men
  Portuguese Championship: 6
1953–54, 1955–56, 1991–92, 1992–93, 1993–94, 2017–18

  Portuguese Cup: 4
1990–91, 1992–93, 1994–95, 2020–21

  Portuguese Super Cup: 3
1990–91, 1991–92, 1992–93

Women
  Portuguese Cup: 2
1984–85, 1985–86

  Portuguese Super Cup: 1
1986–87

Team Roster
Season 2020–2021, as of September 2020.

References

External links

Sporting CP sports
Volleyball clubs established in 1938
1938 establishments in Portugal
Portuguese volleyball teams